Foster Child, also known as John John, is a Filipino indie pregnancy drama film produced by Seiko Films, which stars Cherry Pie Picache as a temporary foster parent to an abandoned child. The film is directed by Brillante Mendoza.

Foster Child is Brillante Mendoza's fourth feature film, following Manoro (2006). Mendoza is the fourth Filipino director whose work was screened in the Directors' Fortnight of the Cannes film fest.

Plot
Thelma (Cherry Pie Picache), together with her husband Dado (Dan Alvaro) and teenage sons Gerald (Alwyn Uytingco) and Yuri (Jiro Manio), are an urban poor family hired by a local foster care facility to provide temporary home and care to abandoned babies pending the latter's formal adoption. The inevitable separation is heart-rending for the foster family.

Thelma's foster child John-John (Kier Segismundo) is to be turned over to his adoptive American parents. Every moment with the 3-year-old John-John becomes more precious as Thelma goes through the day fulfilling her motherly duties for the last time—bathing John-John, feeding him, and bringing him to school where the boy participates in a school presentation.

Cast
 Cherry Pie Picache as Thelma
 Kier Segundo as John-John
 Eugene Domingo as Bianca 
 Jiro Manio as Yuri
 Alwyn Uytingco as Gerald
 Dan Alvaro as Dado

Accolades

28th Durban International Film Festival
 Best Actress: Cherry Pie Picache

6th Gawad Tanglaw Awards
 Best Film: Seiko Films
 Best Story: Ralston Jover
 Best Actress: Cherry Pie Picache
 Best Supporting Actress: Eugene Domingo
 Best Directors: Dante Mendoza

18th Annual Circle Citation (YCC)
 Best Film: Seiko Films
 Best Screenplay: Ralston Jover

5th ENPRESS Golden Screen Awards
 Best Performance by an Actress in a Lead Role (Drama): Cherry Pie Picache

10th Gawad Pasado Awards
 Pinakapasadong Pelikula: Foster Child
 Pinkapasadong Istorya: Ralston Jover
 Natatanging Bituin ng Pelikulang Pilipino sa Taong 2007: Cherry Pie Picache
 Natatanging Direktor ng Pelikulang Pilipino sa Taong 2007: Dante “Brillante” Mendoza

31st Gawad Urian Awards
 Best Actress: Cherry Pie Picache

56th FAMAS Awards
 Best Child Actor: Keir Segismundo

2nd Gawad Genio Awards
 Best Film: Seiko Films
 Best Film Actress: Cherry Pie Picache
 Best Film Child Performer: Keir Segismundo
 Best Film Screenwriter: Ralston Jover
 Best Film Story: Ralston Jover
 International-Excellence Awardee: Cherry Pie Picache
 Outstanding Genio Awardee: Seiko Films

17th Brisbane International Film Festival
 NETPAC Award

References

External links
 

2007 films
Philippine drama films
Philippine independent films
Philippine children's films
Films directed by Brillante Mendoza
Seiko Films films
2000s pregnancy films
2007 independent films
2000s children's drama films
Philippine pregnancy films